The Gladstone Springhouse and Bottling Plant is an historic water bottling facility at 145a Boon Street in Narragansett, Rhode Island.

The springhouse was constructed in 1899 by T. G. Hazard, Jr. The bottling plant building may date from as early as 1911. The site was added to the National Register of Historic Places in 1984.

The springhouse collects the water of Gladstone Springs. It contains about seven and a half feet of water. A projecting gable-roof dormer contains the doorway to the building.

Southwest of the spring house stands a two-story wood-frame structure with a large single-story concrete-block addition, which has seen a variety of uses. The first floor is believed to have originally housed offices, but has been converted to apartments. The upstairs appears to have always been an apartment, probably for the facility manager. The concrete block structure is where bottling and shipping took place.

History 
The availability of fresh spring water via Gladstone Springs was significant to the development of Narragansett Pier, Rhode Island, as a resort area in the decades following the Civil War. In 1899, T. G. Hazard, Jr., built the springhouse to enlarge and cover a pit previously used to collect the spring water.

In 1911, the property was purchased by Syria W. Mathewson, William R. Sweet, and Frederick C. Olney, who formed the Gladstone Springs Water Company. Olney was particularly notable among the group, as one of the first African-American lawyers admitted to practice in the state of Rhode Island. They built the bottling plant structure and enlarged the facilities, intending to begin the production of bottled sodas as well as spring water.

See also
National Register of Historic Places listings in Washington County, Rhode Island

References

Industrial buildings and structures on the National Register of Historic Places in Rhode Island
Buildings and structures in Narragansett, Rhode Island
Drink companies of the United States
Industrial buildings completed in 1899
1899 establishments in Rhode Island
National Register of Historic Places in Washington County, Rhode Island